Richard Martin Key (born 13 April 1956) is an English retired professional football goalkeeper, best remembered for his spells in the Football League with Exeter City and hometown club Cambridge United. His younger brother Lance was also a goalkeeper.

Career statistics

References

1956 births
English footballers
English Football League players
Brentford F.C. players
Living people
Sportspeople from Cambridge
Association football goalkeepers
Coventry City F.C. players
Exeter City F.C. players
Cambridge United F.C. players
Northampton Town F.C. players
Leyton Orient F.C. players
Sunderland A.F.C. players
Swindon Town F.C. players
Cambridge City F.C. players
Southern Football League players